Stephen Charles Kanitz (born in São Paulo)  is a Brazilian business consultant, lecturer, professor and writer.

Academic life
He holds a D.Sc. in Accounting from University of São Paulo, Master's degree in Business Administration from Harvard Business School and bachelor's degree in accounting from the University of São Paulo, where he holds a Professorship, as Full Professor.

Personal life
Kanitz belongs to the Anglican Church of São Paulo.

Professional life
In 1974 he helped introduce credit scoring in Brasil, in a famous article Como Prever Falências, helping higher risk and poorer people access to bank credit.

In 1975 he created the annual award for the Best Run Company of Brazil, Melhores e Maiores for Revista Exame, initiating a movement that became known as benchmarking, just as Tom Peters did with his American 1981 book 'In Search of Excellence'.

In 1992 he was one of the leaders in Brazil for Social Responsibility, creating the first site for volunteer work, www.voluntarios.com.br. He also created one of the first sites in the world for internet charity donations, www.filantropia.org.

In 1994 he created the Best Run Charity Award, the Prêmio Bem Eficiente, that every year awards the best 50 best run charities of Brazil.

Books
He is the author of Brazil: The Emerging Economic Boom 1995-2005, which won the Jabuti Prize of 1995 in non fiction, and periodically writes for Veja magazine. Kanitz has already written 13 books.

His most recent book Família acima de tudo was launched in Brazil in December 2009

He is a coauthor of Contabilidade Introdutória, which has sold 5 million copies, and is the leading text book in Accounting.

Other Books:

Controladoria
O Parecer do Auditor
Os 50 Melhores Artigos
Ponto de Vista, with Roberto Campos.

External links 
 blog
 Official website
 Filantropia.org
 Betting on Brazil

Brazilian economists
Brazilian non-fiction writers
Academic staff of the University of São Paulo
Businesspeople from São Paulo
Harvard Business School alumni
University of São Paulo alumni
Living people
Brazilian people of German descent
Year of birth missing (living people)